The Tūranganui River is a river in the city of Gisborne, New Zealand. Formed by the confluence of the Taruheru River and the Waimata River, it flows through downtown Gisborne to reach the Pacific Ocean at the northern end of Tūranganui-a-Kiwa / Poverty Bay. A memorial to the first landing place in New Zealand by Captain James Cook is located close to the mouth of the river. The entire river is tidal.

The Tūranganui River is sometimes referred to as the shortest river in the Southern Hemisphere.
The Gisborne Harbour basin is separated from the river channel by a concrete breakwater.

The water quality in this river is poor due to it being the drainage point for two very large catchments with various land uses. The fact that this river is tidal at this point improves water quality.

References

Rivers of the Gisborne District
Gisborne, New Zealand
Rivers of New Zealand